The Star Courier is an American daily newspaper published in Kewanee, Illinois. It is owned by Gannett.

The daily newspaper is the largest of Gannett's holdings in Henry County, Illinois, which also include the shopper publication Henry County Advertizer and four weekly newspapers in outlying towns: the Cambridge Chronicle of Cambridge, Galva News of Galva, Geneseo Republic of Geneseo and Orion Gazette of Orion.

The Star Courier was founded in 1898 through the merger of the Kewanee Evening Star and Kewanee Daily Courier, both of which had been founded in the 1890s. Lee Enterprises owned the paper from 1926 to 1999, when it was traded to GateHouse Media.

References

External links 
 

Gannett publications
Newspapers published in Illinois
Henry County, Illinois
Publications established in 1898
1898 establishments in Illinois